Under the Dragon's Tail is a 2005 made-for-TV film starring Peter Outerbridge, Matthew MacFadzean, Hélène Joy, and Flora Montgomery. It was adapted by Janet MacLean from the novel by Maureen Jennings of the same name.

Plot
This is the third film, introducing the character of William Murdoch and his unique ways of doing detective work. Filming took place in Ontario during September and October 2004.

Detective Murdoch investigates the murder of Dolly Capshaw, a mid-wife who provides abortion care. Using new techniques such as fingerprints (or finger marks as they are known at the time) and handwriting analysis, Murdoch eliminates a number of suspects but has proof that a self-righteous and nosy neighbor, Mr. Golding, was in the house. Missing from Capshaw's desk is her register of clients, a large red book with the image of a dragon on the cover. Murdoch's investigation involves many people whose lives had, in one way or another, crossed with Capshaw's including Ettie Weston, who is no longer a prostitute but is now on the stage with a mentalist act and Maude Pedlow, the wife of a prominent Superior Court judge. Meanwhile, Constable George Crabtree is in training for the Toronto police boxing tournament under the tutelage of Inspector Ramsgate. In this film, Maude Pedlow is played by Hélène Joy, who went on to portray Dr Julia Ogden in the later TV series starring Yannick Bisson.

Cast
 Peter Outerbridge - Detective William Murdoch
 Hélène Joy - Maud Pedlow
 Flora Montgomery - Ettie Weston
 Matthew MacFadzean  - Constable George Crabtree

DVDs
All three movies were released on DVD in a boxed set on November 11, 2008.

On March 3, 2015, Acorn Media announced a re-release for all three movies, set for May 26, 2015.

References

External links 
 

Canadian drama television films
2004 television films
2004 films
English-language Canadian films
Films set in Toronto
Films based on Canadian novels
Films directed by John L'Ecuyer
Films set in the 1890s
2000s Canadian films